Baby Blues is a 1941 Our Gang short comedy film directed by Edward Cahn.  It was the 196th Our Gang short (197th episode, 108th talking short, 109th talking episode, and 28th MGM produced episode) that was released.

Plot
When Mickey reads something in a jokebook stating that one out of every four children born is Chinese, he begins to worry that his new baby brother or sister will be Chinese as well. The Gang put Mickey at ease by telling him that it will not be so bad to have a Chinese sibling. The gang then introduce Mickey to Spanky's friend Lee Wong. Once he has learned that people are people no matter what their ethnic background, Mickey is happy—until he discovers that his much-anticipated "kid brother" is not only a girl, but twins to boot.

Cast

The Gang
 Mickey Gubitosi as Mickey Gubitosi
 Billy Laughlin as Froggy
 George McFarland as Spanky
 Billie Thomas as Buckwheat

Additional cast
 Edward Soo Hoo as Lee Wong
 Janet Burston as Mamie Gubitosi
 Freddie Chapman as Bully, tough kid
 Vincent Graeff as Tough kid
 James Gubitosi as Tough kid
 Ruth Tobey as Gladys Gubitosi
 Hank Mann as Zoo assistant
 Margaret Bert as Receptionist
 William Edmunds as Mickey's father
 Eddie Lee as Lee Wong's father
 Jenny Lee as Lee Wong's mother

See also 
Our Gang filmography

References

External links

1941 films
American black-and-white films
1941 comedy films
Films directed by Edward L. Cahn
Metro-Goldwyn-Mayer short films
Our Gang films
1941 short films
1940s American films